El Icha  (Life) is a 2010 film from Tunisia.

Synopsis 
Havet is a Tunisian woman of some forty years. She is a widow and has a twenty-year-old son who has emigrated to Canada. She lives with her mother in a working-class neighborhood in Tunis and works as a telemarketing operator for a French company installed in Tunis. Each morning, she leaves for work, sinking deeper and deeper into suffocating routine. At home, her life is monotonous and of no interest.

Awards 
 Festival de Cine Mediterráneo de Tetuán 2010

External links 

2010 films
Tunisian short films